David Dinenberg is an American business executive best known as the founder and CEO of KIND Financial.

Personal life and education 
David Dinenberg was born in Philadelphia and graduated from Pennsylvania State University. He currently resides in Los Angeles with his family.

Career

Real Chef 
Dinenberg was the co-founder and executive vice president of Real Chef, which developed its own proprietary brand of cooking tools and foods, as well as the nationally known Flavor Magic.

Tycoon Entertainment 
After leaving Real Chef, Dinenberg was  the chief operating officer and a partner at Tycoon Entertainment, a full-service film finance and production company. His responsibilities included the day-to-day operations of the company, deal structure, sourcing debt for the projects as well as budget oversight. He worked with agents, lawyers, producers and distributors, both foreign and domestic.

Grasso Holdings 
Dinenberg was Chief Operations Officer of Grasso Holdings in Philadelphia, a full-service real estate development company, where he ran day-to-day operations for the 45 person organization managing an asset portfolio valued in excess of $400 million. Dinenberg was recognized as one of the Top 20 people to Watch in the Philadelphia Area by Philadelphia Magazine.

KIND Financial 
Dinenberg founded and was the CEO of KIND Financial, a financial technology company providing software solutions to businesses within the cannabis industry transact securely and in compliance with laws and regulations. He has been interviewed or quoted by several media outlets including CNBC, Inc., Forbes, Philadelphia magazine, The Deal, and LA Business Journal.

Board positions 
Dinenburg co-founded the Philadelphia Retail Advisory Board. In 2012, he was named the president and member of the board of directors for the Philadelphia Chapter of the Jewish National Fund, the youngest ever president of any Jewish foundation in the United States.

References

External links
KIND Financial Official site

Living people
American businesspeople
Pennsylvania State University alumni
Year of birth missing (living people)